Mikael Göransson (born 15 May 1966) is a retired Swedish football midfielder.

References

1966 births
Living people
Swedish footballers
GAIS players
Västra Frölunda IF players
Vaasan Palloseura players
IF Elfsborg players
BK Häcken players
Association football midfielders
Swedish expatriate footballers
Expatriate footballers in Finland
Swedish expatriate sportspeople in Finland
Allsvenskan players